Xu Yanwei (born 14 June 1984 in Shanghai) is an Olympic medal-winning swimmer from the People's Republic of China, who became part of the Chinese national swimming team in 2000. She competed at the 2004 Olympic Games in Athens.

She was part of China's 4 × 200 m freestyle relay team, which won the silver medal, beaten by the USA team.

She was also part of China's 4 × 100 m women's freestyle relay team. China reached the final in this event but did not win a medal.

Xu competed as an individual in the 100 m freestyle and 100 m butterfly events, but did not progress past the heat stage in either.

References

1984 births
Living people
Chinese female butterfly swimmers
World record setters in swimming
Olympic silver medalists for China
Olympic swimmers of China
Swimmers from Shanghai
Swimmers at the 2004 Summer Olympics
Swimmers at the 2008 Summer Olympics
Chinese female freestyle swimmers
World Aquatics Championships medalists in swimming
Medalists at the FINA World Swimming Championships (25 m)
Asian Games medalists in swimming
Swimmers at the 2002 Asian Games
Swimmers at the 2006 Asian Games
Medalists at the 2004 Summer Olympics
Olympic silver medalists in swimming
Universiade medalists in swimming
Asian Games gold medalists for China
Asian Games silver medalists for China
Medalists at the 2002 Asian Games
Medalists at the 2006 Asian Games
Universiade gold medalists for China
Universiade silver medalists for China
Universiade bronze medalists for China
Medalists at the 2003 Summer Universiade
Medalists at the 2007 Summer Universiade
20th-century Chinese women
21st-century Chinese women